Søndenfjeldske Avis was a Norwegian newspaper, published in Kristiansand in Vest-Agder county.

Søndenfjeldske Avis was started in 1892. It went defunct in 1903.

References

Defunct newspapers published in Norway
Mass media in Kristiansand
Publications established in 1892
Publications disestablished in 1903
1892 establishments in Norway
1903 disestablishments in Norway
Norwegian-language newspapers